Benoît Bringer (born 1979) is a French investigative journalist and documentary filmmaker based in Paris, France. He is part of the Pulitzer Prize-winning ICIJ's Panama Papers team and director of "Panama Papers : The hold-up of the century", a two-hour documentary aired on France 2 TV investigative series Cash Investigation. He is also the director of "Obama's dirty war"" broadcast on Canal+, an investigation in Yemen and Pakistan on civilian casualties from US drone strikes. His film Primaire au PS : l'improbable scénario, a 90-minute documentary about the first political primary race in France, which aired on Canal+, was selected for FIPA, the Festival International de Programmes Audiovisuels, held in Biarritz, France.
Bringer graduated from ESJ (École Supérieure de journalisme de Lille). He started his career as a reporter for the French public channel France 2.

In 2007, Bringer left France 2 to cover Pakistan and Afghanistan as a correspondent for the French public radios France Inter and France Info, the French Sunday newspaper Le Journal du Dimanche and the French-German public TV channel Arte. Back in France, he became an independent filmmaker, directing documentaries on assignment for various French channels: Canal+, France Télévisions and M6. As of 2016, he is working with Premières Lignes.

References

External links 
 

French journalists
Living people
1979 births
French male non-fiction writers